in Japan) is a fictional character who appears in Nintendo's Mario franchise as an antagonist. He is the son of the series' main antagonist, Bowser. Since his debut in Super Mario Sunshine in 2002, Bowser Jr. has been a recurring character in the Mario series and has been made playable in several spin-offs, such as Mario Superstar Baseball, Mario Strikers Charged, Super Smash Bros. for Nintendo 3DS and Wii U, and Super Smash Bros. Ultimate among many others. He often helps his father to kidnap Princess Peach and defeat Mario, but in the end wants nothing more than to impress his father. Bowser Jr.’s defining traits are his striking resemblance to his father, his energetic and driven personality, his expertise in mechanics and technology, his heavy uses of his Junior Clown Car and Magic Paintbrush, and the bib-like bandana he wears.

Overview
Bowser Jr. is a yellow-skinned Koopa similar to his father with the same yellow and tan skin complexion. He has a light green head, a top-ponytail of orange-red hair held by a black tie, and usually wears a bandana. In his debut in Super Mario Sunshine, he wears a dark blue one with a graffiti of Mario's nose and mustache that he uses to transform into his alter-ego, Shadow Mario. As Shadow Mario, he looks exactly like Mario in form, but is dark blue and translucent.

Bowser Jr. is very skilled, powerful, and a formidable opponent to the Mario brothers. He has remarkable talent with mechanics and computers, able to skillfully invent and pilot a variety of vehicles and giant robots. He uses magic as shown in Mario Super Sluggers where he turned Daisy into a stone statue, and in New Super Mario Bros. where he performs necromancy to revive his dad at the end of the game. He is just as acrobatic as Mario and can perform the same jump techniques. Bowser Jr. is sometimes influenced by his father's temper and bad attitude in any villainous acts. In Mario Party: Island Tour, it is revealed that he would rather be a hero, but does not want to disappoint his father.

Appearances

Bowser Jr. made his debut in Super Mario Sunshine, where he was disguised as Shadow Mario and disrupted Mario's vacation with Princess Peach by painting Isle Delfino with goop and then kidnapping her by framing Mario, after his father tricked him into thinking that Princess Peach was his mother whom he had to protect. Eventually he found out that Peach was not really his mother, but still wanted to get revenge on Mario. He later appeared in New Super Mario Bros., in a role similar to Boom Boom from Super Mario Bros. 3, as the boss of every tower, the midpoint in each of the game's worlds and in the final battle with his father. He appears in the Super Mario Galaxy series, aiding his father in battle, and having three worlds of his own. Alongside the Koopalings, Bowser Jr. re-appeared in the New Super Mario Bros. sequel, New Super Mario Bros. Wii, appearing on an airship. He is in the New Super Mario Bros. U series.

Bowser Jr. is a staple character in the Mario games and spin-offs such as Mario Kart, Mario sports, and the Mario & Sonic series. He is a mini-boss in Mario Party 9. and a playable character in Mario Party: Island Tour. Bowser Jr. made his RPG debut in Paper Mario: Sticker Star (as Paper Bowser Jr.) as one of the bosses. He appeared in Mario & Luigi: Dream Team as a bonus boss in the Battle Ring. Bowser Jr. meets his paper counterpart, Paper Bowser Jr., in Mario & Luigi: Paper Jam. He appeared in Mario & Luigi: Bowser's Inside Story + Bowser Jr.'s Journey as a playable character in Bowser Jr.'s Journey, a side story of his adventure with the Koopalings. Bowser Jr. appears as a playable character in Super Smash Bros. for Nintendo 3DS and Wii U and Super Smash Bros. Ultimate, fighting from atop his Junior Clown Car with Shadow Mario as his Final Smash. Each of his alternate costumes replaces him with one of the Koopalings. Bowser Jr. appears in Super Mario Maker not just as a boss that Mario can fight in all game styles, but also as a Mystery Mushroom costume in the Super Mario Bros. style.

In the Bowser's Fury campaign of Super Mario 3D World + Bowser's Fury, Bowser Jr. forms an uneasy alliance with Mario to confront Bowser, after the latter becomes enlarged and uncontrollably enraged.

Reception
Since Bowser Jr.'s introduction in Super Mario Sunshine, reception to the character has been positive. He ranked sixth on GameDaily's list of the top 10 Nintendo characters that deserve their own games. They also listed him as the 18th best Mario enemy, calling him a "chip off the ol' block" from Bowser. In a satirical article written by Kotaku writer Chi Lee, Bowser Jr. was compared to North Korea's leader Kim Jong-un, and compared the relationship of North Korea and South Korea with the fictional Mushroom Kingdom and Koopa Kingdom. Kotaku also listed Bowser as one of the worst fathers in video gaming, due to allowing Bowser Jr. and the Koopalings to run around with pirate ships and "zappy wands". GameSpy complained that Bowser Jr. was a "dopey successor" to the Koopalings which they liked more, and said that they have "far more charm" when compared to Bowser Jr. 1UP.com listed Fawful as a character they would want more in the Mario Kart series than Bowser Jr. and Waluigi, saying "Unfortunately, rather than exploring the true depth of the series and offering characters like Mario & Luigis Fawful, we get Bowser Jr. and Waluigi. Yeah, great." Australia's Official Nintendo Magazine listed Bowser Jr. as one of the characters they want in Super Smash Bros. 4, as he would be a "fantastic inclusion". Gavin Jasper of Den of Geek ranked Bowser Jr. as 23rd on his list of Super Smash Bros. Ultimate characters, stating that "What we got was a bratty, new part of the Mario mythos that added a little extra dimension to Bowser. Put Bowser Jr. in Smash and you have yourself an amusing and unique brawler."

References

Animal characters in video games
Anthropomorphic video game characters
Child characters in video games
Fictional criminals in video games
Fictional male sportspeople
Fictional monsters
Fictional turtles
Fictional inventors in video games
Male characters in video games
Male video game villains
Mario (franchise) characters
Mario (franchise) enemies
Super Smash Bros. fighters
Video game bosses
Video game characters introduced in 2002
Video game characters with fire or heat abilities
Fictional kidnappers
Male villains
Prince characters in video games

pl:Postacie ze świata Mario#Bowser Jr.